The Lindau Lighthouse is the southernmost lighthouse in Germany, in Lindau on Lake Constance. Notably, it has a clock in its facade.

History 
The lighthouse was built from 1853 to 1856 at the western mole in the entrance to the harbour of Lindau and was first lit on 4 October 1856. It succeeded the light station in the Mangturm tower of 1230.

Light and optics 
During the first years of operation, the light was created by an open oil fire. At that time the keeper would have to keep the fire burning steadily in great pans and operate a bell and foghorn. The firing was later converted to kerosene and then gas.

Since 1936 the tower has been operated electrically and was automated in the early 1990s. The light is lit on demand by ships using radio signals.

The light characteristic is one flash every three seconds, which is created by two rotating parabolic reflectors.

Current situation 

The lighthouse and the entire port of Lindau were originally built for the Ludwig South-North Railway of the Royal Bavarian State Railways and later used to be operated by the shipping department for Lake Constance of Deutsche Bahn. Eventually the port was sold to the city works of Constance in 2002 together with the Bodensee-Schiffsbetriebe GmbH shipping company. After several years of negotiations, the port area and thus the lighthouse was transferred to the town of Lindau in April 2010. It is open to visitors who may find information on local fauna and flora and on Lake Constance shipping.

The lighthouse is a popular subject for photographs (from the north side of the harbour together with the "Bavarian Lion" on the other side of the harbour entrance).

See also 

 List of lighthouses and lightvessels in Germany

References

External links 
 

Lighthouses completed in 1856
Lighthouses in Germany
Buildings and structures in Lindau (district)